The Church is an American horror film written and directed by Dom Frank. It stars Bill Moseley, Ashley C. Williams, Lisa Wilcox, Keith Stallwortch, and Clint Howard.

Synopsis 
The church board and the development team come face to face with a supernatural presence when they agree to sell the church.

Cast 
 Bill Moseley as Pastor James
 Ashley C. Williams as Elizabeth Haines
 Lisa Wilcox as Joan Laurels
 Keith Stallworth as Simon Adu
 Clint Howard as Alexander James / The Spirit
 Vito LoGrasso as Adrian Seltzer
 Victoria Gates as Jennifer Lawson
 Deitra Leak as Melanie Banks
 Holly Zuelle as Veronica Leeks

Reception 
Sherilyn Connelly of SF Weekly wrote that film is "far from great, but it’s never boring, and that’s good enough for the faithful." In a mixed review for Los Angeles Times, Noel Murray wrote "There’s an appealing, old-school crumminess to the supernatural thriller “The Church,” the kind of micro-budgeted bad movie that may exist only because the filmmaker had access to a location and wrote a story to accommodate it." Murray then criticized the acting, writing "Frank doesn’t really have the budget — or the cast — to make the horror elements in “The Church” effective. Most of the actors are inexperienced and stiff; whenever they’re supposed to be tormented by the paranormal, the special effects meant to illustrate the hauntings are either nonexistent or cheesy."

In a negative review for Variety, Dennis Harvey criticized the writing, direction, and special effects, stating that "Those limitations could conceivably lend a certain charm if the movie had energy, audacity, and a few good ideas — things present in such even-lower-budgeted Christian screen parables of damnation as Ron Ormond’s 1974 “The Burning Hell.” But Frank’s script is half-baked and his direction lethargic. Much of the highly clunky dialogue is beyond certain cast members’ abilities to smooth over."

Release 
The film received a limited theatrical release in 30 theaters on October 5, 2018.

References

External links 
 
 
 

American independent films
2018 films
American supernatural horror films
Films set in religious buildings and structures
2010s English-language films
2010s American films